Proctor Silex Co. was created in 1960 with the merger of Proctor Electric and the Silex Company. In 1988, Proctor Silex was acquired by NACCO Industries, Inc.  In 1990, NACCO also acquired Hamilton Beach Brands as a subsidiary and merged the two companies.

Proctor Silex made electrical household appliances like vacuum coffee makers.

References

External links

The Marshall Johnson Collection of Trade Literature and Ephemera at Hagley Museum and Library consists of materials collected by Johnson during his time with Wear-Ever/Proctor-Silex, including product catalogs, news clippings, and advertisements, with a small amount of manuscript materials.

Home appliance manufacturers
Home appliance brands
Kitchenware brands
Manufacturing companies based in Virginia
Manufacturing companies established in 1960
Products introduced in 1960
Home appliance manufacturers of the United States
Coffee appliance vendors